Ormosia henryi is a species of flowering plant in the family Fabaceae, native to southern China, Vietnam, and Thailand.

Description
Efforts are being made to bring it into cultivation, as its wood is considered precious. It is used as a street tree in a number of southern Chinese cities.

References

henryi
Flora of South-Central China
Flora of Southeast China
Flora of Thailand
Flora of Vietnam
Plants described in 1900